Igor Vladimirovich Makeyev (27 October 1971 in Ganja, Azerbaijan SSR - 2 August 1992 in the Aghdara District, Azerbaijan) was a National Hero of Azerbaijan and warrior during the First Nagorno-Karabakh War.

Early life and education 
Makeyev was born on October 27, 1971 in Ganja, Azerbaijan SSR. He went to Secondary School No. 39 in Baku between 1979 and 1987.  In 1990,  Makeyev was drafted to the Soviet Armed Forces and served in Baku and in Rostov, Russia.

When the First Nagorno-Karabakh war started, Makeyev returned to Ganja. He joined one of the military units in the Ministry of Internal Affairs of Azerbaijan and voluntarily went to the front-line.

Personal life 
Makeyev was single.

First Nagorno-Karabakh War 
On June 5, 1992 Armenians attacked the Nakhchivanli village. Makeyev participated in battles around the village and killed dozens of Armenian soldiers. He also participated in several battles around Aghdara during the First Nagorno-Karabakh War. On August 2, 1992 he was killed in a fight with Armenian soldiers around Vishka.

Honors 
Makeyev was posthumously awarded the title of "National Hero of Azerbaijan" by Presidential Decree No. 290 dated 6 November 1992. He was buried at a Martyrs' Lane cemetery in Ganja. A street in Sadilli village was named after him.

See also 
 First Nagorno-Karabakh War
 List of National Heroes of Azerbaijan

References

Sources 
Vugar Asgarov. Azərbaycanın Milli Qəhrəmanları (Yenidən işlənmiş II nəşr). Bakı: "Dərələyəz-M", 2010, səh. 180.

1971 births
1992 deaths
Military personnel from Ganja, Azerbaijan
Azerbaijani military personnel of the Nagorno-Karabakh War
Azerbaijani military personnel killed in action
National Heroes of Azerbaijan